The Importance of Being Earnest is a 1932 German comedy film directed by Franz Wenzler and starring Charlotte Ander and Georg Alexander. It was shot at the Johannisthal Studios in Berlin. It is an adaptation of Oscar Wilde's 1895 play The Importance of Being Earnest.

Cast
 Charlotte Ander
 Georg Alexander as Ernst
 Harald Paulsen
 Adele Sandrock
 Ilse Korseck
 Gertrud Wolle
 Julius Falkenstein
 Erich Kestin
 Hilde Hildebrand
 Kurt Lilien
 Gerhard Dammann
 Gustav Püttjer
 Emmy Wyda

References

Bibliography 
 Klaus, Ulrich J. Deutsche Tonfilme: Jahrgang 1932. Klaus-Archiv, 1988.

External links 
 

1932 films
Films of the Weimar Republic
German comedy films
1932 comedy films
1930s German-language films
Films directed by Franz Wenzler
German black-and-white films
Films based on The Importance of Being Earnest
German films based on plays
1930s German films
Films shot at Johannisthal Studios